α-PCyP is a stimulant drug of the cathinone class that has been sold online as a designer drug. In a series of alpha-substituted pyrrolidinyl cathinone derivatives developed in 2015, the alpha-cyclopentyl derivative was found to have around the same potency in vitro as an inhibitor of the dopamine transporter as the alpha-propyl derivative α-PVP, while the alpha-cyclohexyl derivative α-PCyP was around twice as strong.

See also 
 PCPy
 Picilorex
 α-PHP
 α-PHiP
 βk-Ephenidine
 Diphenidine
 Indapyrophenidone
 UWA-101
 Zylofuramine

References 

Pyrrolidinophenones
Designer drugs
Serotonin-norepinephrine-dopamine releasing agents